Herbiconiux moechotypicola is a Gram-positive, rod-shaped and non-motile bacterium from the genus of Herbiconiux which has been isolated from the gut of the beetle Moechotypa diphysis in Korea.

References

Microbacteriaceae
Bacteria described in 2012